Thurn may refer to:

 Thurn, Austria, a town near Lienz, Tyrol
 Thurn Pass, an Alpine mountain pass in Austria
 Thurn und Taxis, a historical noble house

See also

 Turn (disambiguation)
 Thurm
 Thurnen (disambiguation)